Slime Language 2 is the second compilation album by American record label Young Stoner Life. It was released in conjunction with the label’s founder, Young Thug, and one of the label’s artists, Gunna. The compilation was released via the aforementioned Young Stoner Life and 300 Entertainment on April 16, 2021. It serves as a sequel to the 2018 release by the label and  features outside guest appearances from Travis Scott, Drake, Rowdy Rebel, Lil Baby, Lil Uzi Vert, Coi Leray, Big Sean, Nav, Skepta, Future, YNW Melly, Yung Bleu, Sheck Wes, Kid Cudi, and Meek Mill.

A deluxe edition of the record was released on April 23, 2021. It featured additional outside guest appearances from DaBaby, Don Toliver and Jim Jones.

The compilation was supported by three singles: "Take It to Trial", "That Go!", and "GFU". The album spawned two more singles, "Ski" and "Solid", which debuted at number 18 and 12, respectively, on the US Billboard Hot 100.

Background and release
Gunna revealed the existence of Slime Language 2 in an interview for his second studio album, Wunna, on May 22, 2020, which was released on the same day. Young Thug announced a release date on July 29, 2020, tweeting "#Slimelanguage2 8-16", before later deleting the post. On October 19, 2020, Thug was thought to have confirmed the album's release date of November 27, 2020, for Black Friday and confirmed that late American rapper and singer Juice Wrld would be featured. Instead, the album's lead single, "Take It to Trial", featuring American rapper and YSL Records signee Yak Gotti, was released on Black Friday, but taken down abruptly, later it got back up with a new cover art on December 18, 2020. On November 19, 2020, in an interview on American rapper T.I.'s podcast, Expeditiously, Young Thug revealed that he was working on Slime Language 2 and his upcoming second studio album, Punk, wanting to "start anew" and "start a new relationship with my label". On the same day, he was working with Gunna and Lil Baby in the studio. He officially announced the album's release date on April 12, 2021, also sharing the album's cover art. Artists signed to YSL Records who contribute to the album consist of Young Thug (label boss), Gunna, Yak Gotti, Lil Duke, YTB Trench, Yung Kayo, Thug's brother Unfoonk, Thug's girlfriend Karlae, T-Shyne, Lil Keed, Strick, FN Da Dealer, Thug's nephew BSlime and Thug's sisters HiDoraah and Dolly White. The other artists who appear on the album consist of Travis Scott, Drake, Rowdy Rebel, Lil Uzi Vert, Coi Leray, Big Sean, Nav, Skepta, Future,  YNW Melly, Yung Bleu, Sheck Wes, Kid Cudi, and Meek Mill. The only artist who is signed to YSL on the deluxe edition of the album is Thug's daughter Mego. The non-YSL-signed artists from the deluxe edition consist of DaBaby, Don Toliver, Jim Jones, and 24Heavy.

Singles
The album's lead single, "Take It to Trial", featuring American rapper and YSL signee Yak Gotti, was released on December 18, 2020. "GFU", performed by Yak Gotti and American rapper Sheck Wes, featuring American rapper and fellow YSL signee Yung Kayo, was released on January 29, 2021, as its second single. On February 12, 2021, "That Go!", performed by Young Thug and American rapper Meek Mill, featuring American rapper and fellow YSL signee T-Shyne, was released as the third and final single.

Cover artwork
The cover art is in the form of a large family portrait, showing the YSL collective sitting in a horror film-inspired living room. Behind the collective, lightning bolts can be seen outside the windows, while a green dog sits in front of everyone, reminiscent of The Mask.

Critical reception

Hypebeasts Sophie Caraan noted of the album: "Despite having a myriad of featured artists in addition to the collective, Slime Language 2 shines a light on both the adaptability and star quality of the YSL Records signees, effectively proving that these artists will stand the tests of time and go down on their own paths to greatness".

Commercial performance
Slime Language 2 debuted at number one on the US Billboard 200 chart with 113,000 album-equivalent units, including 6,000 pure album sales in its first week. This marks the third number one album for YSL Records, after Young Thug's So Much Fun in 2019 and Gunna's Wunna in 2020.

Track listing
Album is credited to Young Stoner Life, Young Thug and Gunna. All tracks are credited to Young Stoner Life. Standard tracks 1-4, 6 and 16 are co-credited to Young Thug and Gunna. Standard tracks 5, 7, 8, 13, 19 and 23 are co-credited solely to Young Thug. Standard track 14 is co-credited solely to Gunna. Standard track 18 is co-credited to Yak Gotti and Sheck Wes. Standard track 22 is co-credited to Young Thug and Meek Mill. Deluxe track 1 is co-credited to Young Thug and Gunna. Deluxe tracks 2-4, 7 and 8 are co-credited solely to Young Thug. Deluxe track 5 is co-credited solely to Gunna.

Notes
  signifies a co-producer
  signifies an uncredited additional producer

Personnel
Credits adapted from Tidal.

Musicians

 YSL Records – primary artist 
 Young Thug – primary artist 
 Gunna – primary artist 
 Yak Gotti – featured artist , primary artist 
 Lil Duke – featured artist 
 Travis Scott – featured artist 
 Drake – featured artist 
 Rowdy Rebel – featured artist 
 Lil Baby – featured artist 
 YTB Trench – featured artist 
 Lil Uzi Vert – featured artist 
 Yung Kayo – featured artist 
 Unfoonk – featured artist 
 Karlae – featured artist 
 T-Shyne – featured artist 
 Lil Keed – featured artist 
 Big Sean – featured artist 
 Nav – featured artist 
 Strick – featured artist 
 Future – featured artist 
 YNW Melly – featured artist 
 BSlime – featured artist 
 FN Da Dealer – featured artist 
 Yung Bleu – featured artist 
 Sheck Wes – primary artist 
 Kid Cudi – featured artist 
 HiDoraah – featured artist 
 Dolly White – featured artist 
 Meek Mill – primary artist 
 DaBaby – featured artist 
 Don Toliver – featured artist 
 Mego – featured artist 
 Jim Jones – featured artist 
 Chief 100 – featured artist

Technical

 A "Bainz" Bains – mixing, recording 
 Aresh Banaji – co-mixing 
 Florian "Flo" Ongonga – assistant mixing 
 Joe LaPorta – mastering 
 Drew Sliger – recording , mixing assistant 
 Bezo – assistant engineer 
 Alejandro "Aleo" Neira – recording 
 Shaan Singh – recording 
 Warpstr – recording 
 Jonathan Bailey – assistant engineer 
 Anthony Cruz – recording 
 Slice – recording 
 Travis Blake – recording

Charts

Weekly charts

Year-end charts

Release history

References

2021 compilation albums
Young Thug albums
Gunna (rapper) albums
Albums produced by Southside (record producer)
Albums produced by Wheezy
Albums produced by Lil' C (record producer)
YSL Records albums
Record label compilation albums
Sequel albums